The men's basketball tournament at the 2016 Summer Olympics in Rio de Janeiro, began on 6 August and ended on 21 August. The gold medal game in this discipline was the final competitive event before the Closing Ceremony. The United States won their fifteenth gold medal, after defeating Serbia, 96–66, in the gold medal match, which was the largest margin of victory in a gold medal game since the 1992 Summer Olympics. 

Spain won the bronze medal, after an 89–88 win over Australia.

The medals were presented by Patrick Baumann of Switzerland, Dr. Rene Fasel of Switzerland, Kirsty Coventry of Zimbabwe, and members of the International Olympic Committee, while the gifts were presented by Horacio Muratore, the President of FIBA, Hamine Niang, the first Vice-President of FIBA, and Jerry Colangelo, the chairman of USA Basketball.

Competition schedule

Qualification

Squads

Each NOC was limited to one team per tournament. Each team had a roster of twelve players, one of which could be a naturalized player.

Referees
The following referees were selected for the tournament.

  Carlos Júlio
  Leandro Lezcano
  Scott Beker
  Vaughan Mayberry
  Guilherme Locatelli
  Cristiano Maranho
  Karen Lasuik
  Stephen Seibel
  Duan Zhu
  Sreten Radović
  Natalia Cuello
  Eddie Viator
  Robert Lottermoser
  Anne Panther
  Christos Christodoulou
  Nadege Zouzou
  Hwang In-tae
  Oļegs Latiševs
  José Reyes
  Chahinaz Boussetta
  Ahmed Al-Bulushi
  Ferdinand Pascual
  Piotr Pastusiak
  Roberto Vázquez
  Ilija Belošević
  Damir Javor
  Juan Carlos García
  Carlos Peruga
  Borys Ryzhyk
  Steven Anderson

Draw
The draw was held at the FIBA Headquarters, also known as the "House of Basketball" in Mies, Switzerland, on 11 March 2016. As the three winners of the 2016 FIBA World Olympic Qualifying Tournaments for Men (OQT) were yet to be known, they were assigned placeholders as "OQT 1", "OQT 2" and "OQT 3". These were the pot assignments:

Group A was assigned with OQT 1 and OQT 2, while Group B had OQT 3.

After the World Olympic Qualifying Tournament on 10 July 2016, another draw was held at the Mall of Asia Arena in Pasay, Philippines, to determine which among the teams would be assigned to which group. This was a straight draw: there were two pots containing three balls each. One pot had the names of the teams that won the Olympic Qualifying Tournaments (OQT), while the other pot had the name of the placeholders.

Group stage
All times are local (UTC−3).

Group A

Group B

Knockout stage

Bracket

Quarterfinals

Semifinals

Bronze medal game

Gold medal game

Awards

Statistical leaders
Source

Individual tournament highs

Points

Rebounds

Assists

Blocks

Steals

Minutes

Individual game highs

Team tournament highs

Points

Rebounds

Assists

Blocks

Steals

Team game highs

Final ranking
Rankings are determined by:
 1st–4th
 Results of gold and bronze medal games
 5th–8th:
 Win–loss record in the preliminary round group
 Standings in the preliminary round group (i.e. Group A's 3rd is ranked higher than Group B's 4th.)
 9th–10th and 11th–12th:
 5th placers in the preliminary round groups are classified 9th–10th; 6th placers classified 11th–12th
 Win–loss record in the preliminary round group

References

External links
 Official website

 
Basketball at the 2016 Summer Olympics
Basketball at the Summer Olympics – Men's tournament